Jesse Rodriguez may refer to:

 Jesse Rodriguez (boxer), American boxer
 Jesse Rodriguez (swimmer), Salvadoran swimmer
 Jess Rodriguez, American football player